Robert Philip Militello a.k.a. Bobby M. (born 25 March 1950) is an American jazz saxophonist and flautist who was a member of the Dave Brubeck Quartet.

Career
During the 1970s, Militello went on tour with Maynard Ferguson. He returned to Buffalo in the early 1980s and worked as a freelance musician. He moved to Los Angeles and spent the rest of the 1980s and early 1990s as a member of orchestras led by Bill Holman and Bob Florence. He toured and recorded with Dave Brubeck from 1982 to 2012. He leads a quartet that performs concerts dedicated to Brubeck.

Discography

As leader
 1982 Blow (Gordy)
 1993 Heart & Soul (Positive Music)
 1994 Easy to Love (Positive Music)
 1995 Straight Ahead (Positive Music)

As sideman
With Dave Brubeck  
 1991 Quiet as the Moon
 1996 To Hope! A Celebration
 1997 So What's New? 
 1998 The 40th Anniversary Tour of the U.K.
 1999 Hold Fast to Dreams
 1999 The 40th Anniversary Tour of the U.K
 2000 Dave Brubeck: Live with the LSO 
 2001 The Crossing 
 2001 Double Live from the U.S.A. and U.K.
 2002 80th Birthday Concert: Live With the LSO
 2002 Park Avenue South
 2003 Classical Brubeck
 2005 London Flat, London Sharp

With Maynard Ferguson
 1976 Primal Scream
 1977 Conquistador
 1977 New Vintage
 1978 Carnival
 1979 Hot
 1981 Maynard

With others
 1982 Let's Stay Together, Jean Carn
 1987 The Bill Holman Band, Bill Holman
 1988 Body Lines, Rick Strauss
 1988 This Is for You, Emiel van Egdom
 1990 Treasure Chest, Bob Florence
 1991 Strollin' , Charlie Shoemake
 1992 50th Anniversary Celebration, Kenton Alumni Band
 1992 Something Cool, Cheryl Bentyne
 1994 Better Place, Jeff Jarvis
 1995 Brighter Days, Ken Navarro
 1995 Contents Under Pressure, Jeff Jarvis
 1997 A Collection of Great Standards, Michael Civisca
 1997 Hybrid Groove, Emiel van Egdom
 1997 Singin' & Swingin' , Nancy Kelly
 2004 I'd Like You for Christmas, Mary Stahl
 2006 Midnight in Manhattan, Lisa Hilton
 2007 After Dark, Lisa Hilton
 2008 Jazz for Peanuts, David Benoit
 2017 Remembering Mark Murphy, Nancy Kelly
 2022 Brazilin Images, César Haas

External links

 1998 interview with Living Prime Time

1950 births
Living people
American jazz saxophonists
American male saxophonists
Musicians from Buffalo, New York
University at Buffalo faculty
20th-century American musicians
Jazz musicians from New York (state)
21st-century American saxophonists
20th-century American male musicians
21st-century American male musicians
American male jazz musicians
Dave Brubeck Quartet members